Reign of Fire is a 2002 post-apocalyptic science fantasy film directed by Rob Bowman and starring Matthew McConaughey and Christian Bale, with the screenplay written by Matt Greenberg, Gregg Chabot, and Kevin Peterka. The film also features Izabella Scorupco and Gerard Butler.

The film is set in England in the year 2020, twenty years after London tunneling project workers inadvertently awakened dragons from centuries of slumber and the creatures have subsequently replaced humans as the dominant species on Earth. With the fate of mankind at stake, two surviving parties, led by Quinn Abercromby (Bale) and Denton Van Zan (McConaughey), find that they must work together to hunt down and destroy the beasts in a desperate attempt to take back the world.

The film was released by Touchstone Pictures on 12 July 2002. Upon release, it received generally mixed reviews from critics and audiences and was a box office disappointment, grossing far less than expected, only $82 million on a $60 million budget.

Plot
Soon after the start of the 21st century, during construction on the London Underground, workers penetrate a cave and a huge dragon emerges from hibernation, incinerating the workers with its breath. The only survivor is a boy, Quinn Abercromby, whose mother, Karen —the project engineer—is crushed to death protecting him. The dragon flies out of the Underground, and soon more dragons appear. Years later, Quinn, now an adult, records the events that transpired after the first dragon sighting. Scientists discovered that dragons were the species responsible for the extinction of the dinosaurs and most plant life on the planet when they razed it with fire; the ash from this event caused the first Ice age before the dragons disappeared, presumably in a cycle of hibernation. Once re-emerged, the population surged to several million, prompting most militaries to use increasingly devastating weapons, finally leading to targeting the largest population areas with nuclear weapons in 2010; however, this only hastened the destruction, and by 2020, humans are nearly extinct. The dragons, now starving as well, are dying off and increasingly aggressive in search of food.

Quinn, along with his best friend Creedy leads a community of survivors at Bamburgh Castle, Northumberland where he plans to outlast dragons until they go back into hibernation; as insurance, he shares his notes and plans with Jared an orphan he rescued as a child and is grooming to lead the community. The community is short on supplies and in a state of unrest pending the harvest of their meager crops. Eddie and his group steal a truck to pilfer the crops early, but they are attacked by a dragon. One man is killed and the rest are surrounded by fire. Quinn, Creedy, and Jared rescue them with old fire engines, but the dragon kills Eddie's son before escaping and burns the majority of the crops, leaving the community without a means to feed itself.

Shortly afterwards, a group of heavily armed Americans arrive in an armored convoy with a Chieftain tank and an AgustaWestland AW109 utility helicopter. The leader, Denton Van Zan, explains that they are the Kentucky Irregulars. They flew 8,000 miles from the USA in a rebuilt National Guard C-5 Galaxy on two engines, lost 122 men and most of their fuel when they tried to land on the old strip, outside of Manchester. They are some of the last remaining military dragon hunters seeking safe haven on their way to London. Initially skeptical and worried that they are marauders, Van Zan convinces Quinn by sharing the dragons' main weakness: poor vision during twilight. With Quinn's help, Van Zan and his team hunt and slay the dragon who destroyed the crops.

The survivors enjoy a celebration at the castle that night but Van Zan is embittered by the loss of three of his men. Van Zan introduces Quinn to Alex Jensen, his team's helicopter pilot and intelligence officer and together they brief Quinn on their mission. After killing over 200 dragons, Alex discovered that they were all female; she postulates that they reproduce quickly because the species relies on a single male to fertilize the eggs. Having tracked the spread of the dragons, they believe that the male is located in London and that if they kill it, they will effectively stop dragons from reproducing. Although Quinn suspects that the male dragon is the same one that had killed his mother, he refuses to help knowing that London is a dragon stronghold and that if they fail, the dragon will track them back to their shelter.

Van Zan  first recruits, then "drafts" the castle's six best defenders, despite Quinn's objections and a physical altercation. Van Zan and some of the castle's men then depart, but true to Quinn's warnings, their caravan is attacked by the dragon in the ruins of a town  from London. Everyone but Van Zan, Jensen and a survivor are killed. The dragon then finds the castle and kills many of the inhabitants. Quinn gets the survivors to a bunker, but they are trapped when the dragon returns; during its final attack, Creedy is killed.

Van Zan and Jensen return and free everyone trapped in the bunker. Quinn leaves Jared in charge and decides to help Van Zan and Alex hunt down the male dragon as their best chance at survival. They fly to London and find hundreds of small dragons, one of which is cannibalized by the larger male. This scatters the smaller dragons and leaves the male undefended. Without the support needed for a major battle, Van Zan coordinates a simplified plan: split up, bait the male into attacking, ground him with explosives, and then have another member shoot explosives into his mouth once he is ground level. The plan initially works, but the dragon detonates the initial explosives early and Van Zan is devoured. Quinn and Alex gather the last explosives and together, they lure the dragon to ground level, where Quinn fires an explosive down the dragon's throat, killing it.

Later, Quinn and Alex erect a radio tower on a hill overlooking the North Sea. There has been no dragon sighting for over three months. Jared arrives to say they have contacted a group of French survivors who want to speak to their leader. Quinn officially makes Jared the community leader and dedicates himself to rebuilding civilization with Alex.

Cast

Production

Kevin Peterka and Gregg Chabot wrote the original screenplay in 1996, after which they sold it to Spyglass Media Group. In 2000 Matt Greenberg revised the screenplay for production.

Reign of Fire was filmed in Ireland's Wicklow Mountains, at the Glendasan Valley Lead Mines. Permission was given on the condition that the area was not damaged and the crew removed all sets once filming was complete. However, an outbreak of foot-and-mouth disease in Europe stopped many planned scenes from being filmed due to quarantine restrictions.

The dead dragon was designed and built by Artem, with visual effects by Secret Lab. The dragon's digital effects posed a problem for animators: "In recent years there have been several movies starring creatures with scaled surfaces. Among these are Jurassic Park, Dragonheart, and Lake Placid. The surfaces of these creatures have generally been constructed by layering painted textures atop displacement maps. This gives the model texture, but the scales stretch and shrink under the movement of the creature, giving a rubbery look that is not realistic." In order to overcome this limitation, the then-groundbreaking work done by digital effects animator Neil Eskuri on Disney's 2000 release Dinosaur was utilized as a benchmark in order to create a realistic physical simulation of the dragon. According to Carlos Gonzalez-Ochoa, the film called for " creatures with wing spans of  that could undergo enormous speeds and accelerations. The artistic direction required each dragon to have wings that transition between a variety of physical behaviors and interact with the environment."

Soundtrack

Reception
On Rotten Tomatoes, the film has an approval rating of 42% based on 173 reviews, with an average rating of 5.2/10. The site's consensus states: "Reign of Fire gains some altitude with its pyrotechnic action and a smolderingly campy Matthew McConaughey, but the feature's wings are clipped by a derivative script and visual effects that fizzle out." On Metacritic, it has score of 39 out of 100, based on 30 reviews from critics. Audiences surveyed by CinemaScore gave the film a grade B on scale of A to F.

Joe Leydon of Variety said of the film, "An uncommonly exciting and satisfying post-apocalyptic popcorn flick, Director Rob Bowman deftly combines an uncommonly satisfying mix of medieval fantasy, high-tech military action and "Mad Max"-style misadventure." Lisa Schwarzbaum of Entertainment Weekly agreed, giving the film a B and saying "the season could do with more grinning, spinning, un-self-important, happy-to-be-B throwback movies like this one." Elvis Mitchell of The New York Times noted that "the movie might have been a minor classic if it had maximized its own possibilities. But until the rush wears off, the picture is as much fun as a great run at a slot machine: even when your luck runs out, you're losing only pocket change."

Roger Ebert gave the film one star out of four, describing it as "a vast enterprise marshaled in the service of such a minute idea", adding that "the movie makes no sense on its own terms, let alone ours. And it is such a grim and dreary enterprise. One prays for a flower or a ray of sunshine as those grotty warriors clamber into their cellars and over their slag heaps."

Reign of Fire was third at the US box-office receipts during its opening weekend (12 July 2002), taking in $15,632,281, behind Road to Perdition and Men in Black II.

Awards
Reign of Fire was nominated for one Saturn Award, but lost to The Lord of the Rings: The Two Towers and two Festival de Cine de Sitges awards, winning one.

Video game
In 2002, Kuju Entertainment released the video game adaptation Reign of Fire for PlayStation 2, Xbox and GameCube, which received mixed reviews.

Cancelled sequel
In a 2002 interview, Christian Bale was asked: "Is there a sequel possibility to Reign of Fire?" to which Bale responded "Possibly. I told Scott Moutter, who plays my stepson in the movie, that he's well positioned to take the sequel from me because of the way the movie ends!".

Legacy
The mechanism of dragon's fire breath in this movie, inspired from biology of real-life creatures such as anti-predator adaptation of bombardier beetle and poison glands of vipers, was used in later works such as Harry Potter and the Goblet of Fire, Harry Potter and the Deathly Hallows – Part 1, Gods of Egypt, and Game of Thrones.

References

External links

 
 
 
 
 

2002 films
2000s disaster films
2002 fantasy films
2000s monster movies
2000s science fiction thriller films
2000s thriller films
American disaster films
American dystopian films
American fantasy action films
American monster movies
American science fantasy films
American science fiction action films
British action horror films
British monster movies
British science fantasy films
British science fiction action films
Films about cannibalism
English-language Irish films
Irish fantasy action films
Irish action horror films
Films scored by Edward Shearmur
Films about dragons
Films directed by Rob Bowman
Films set in 2000
Films set in 2020
Films set in castles
Films set in England
Films set in London
Films set in Northumberland
Films set in the future
Films shot in Ireland
Films shot in County Wicklow
Films produced by Richard D. Zanuck
Films produced by Roger Birnbaum
Giant monster films
American post-apocalyptic films
Spyglass Entertainment films
Touchstone Pictures films
Irish science fiction action films
American action horror films
Irish survival films
American survival films
2000s survival films
British post-apocalyptic films
The Zanuck Company films
2000s English-language films
2000s American films
2000s British films
Films set in bunkers